Ed V. Mead (1921 – 1983) was an American politician and businessman who served as the 17th Lieutenant Governor of New Mexico under Governor John Burroughs.

Background 
Mead was born and raised in Abilene, Texas. He relocated Albuquerque, New Mexico in 1948, where he operated a bakery business. Mead was elected the 17th lieutenant governor of New Mexico in 1958 and assumed office on January 1, 1959. He served until January 1, 1961 and was succeeded in office by Tom Bolack. Mead was a candidate in the 1962 New Mexico gubernatorial election, losing the Democratic primary to Jack M. Campbell. From 1964 to 1974, he served as a member of the New Mexico Senate. He also served on the Bernalillo County Commission.

Mead died at St. Joseph Hospital in Albuquerque, New Mexico at the age of 61.

References 

1921 births
1983 deaths
Lieutenant Governors of New Mexico
Democratic Party New Mexico state senators
People from Abilene, Texas
Businesspeople from New Mexico
20th-century American politicians
20th-century American businesspeople